The men's 200 metres at the 1958 European Athletics Championships was held in Stockholm, Sweden, at Stockholms Olympiastadion on 22 and 23 August 1958.

Medalists

Results

Final
23 August
Wind: 0.1 m/s

Semi-finals
22 August

Semi-final 1
Wind: 0 m/s

Semi-final 2
Wind: 0 m/s

Semi-final 3
Wind: 0.2 m/s

Heats
22 August

Heat 1
Wind: 1 m/s

Heat 2
Wind: 1 m/s

Heat 3
Wind: 1.5 m/s

Heat 4
Wind: 0.5 m/s

Heat 5
Wind: 0.6 m/s

Heat 6
Wind: 0.8 m/s

Participation
According to an unofficial count, 25 athletes from 18 countries participated in the event.

 (2)
 (1)
 (1)
 (1)
 (1)
 (1)
 (2)
 (2)
 (2)
 (1)
 (1)
 (1)
 (2)
 (1)
 (1)
 (1)
 (2)
 (2)

References

200 metres
200 metres at the European Athletics Championships